Miss Cuba is a former national beauty pageant in Cuba. The pageant was established in 1952 and last edition was until 1967.

History
Miss Cuba was held for the first time in 1952 and the winner competed at the Miss Universe pageant. After 1967 Cuban stopped participating at Miss Universe. In 1956 Cuba made its debut at the Miss World pageant. After 1975 Cuban representatives at Miss World did not compete. In 2007 Cuba made its debut at the Miss Earth pageant in Manila, Philippines. In 2009 Cuba competed for the first time at Miss International in Japan. Cuba has been represented in the Big Four international beauty pageants, the four major international as well as minor international beauty pageants for women. These are Miss World, Miss Universe, Miss International and Miss Earth.

Miss Universe
In 1956 and 1957 Miss Cuba placed as Top 15 and 3rd Runner-up by Marcia Rodríguez and Maria Rosa Gamio.

Miss World
Gilda Marín is the first Miss Cuba who crowned as the 3rd Runner-up at Miss World 1955.

Maricela Maxie Clark is the last Miss Cuba who was crowned as the 3rd Runner-up at Miss World 1975.

Miss Earth
Cuba was first represented in the seventh edition of the environmentally-oriented Miss Earth 2007 beauty pageant by Ariana Barouk. She was the first Miss Cuba in several decades to compete in a major pageant.

Miss International
Began 2009 Cuba's Miss International titleholder represents Cuba at Miss International and for the first time debuting Cuba placed as Top 15 by Patricia Rosales.

Titleholders
In 1952–1967 Cuba participated at the Miss Universe pageant. The winner of Miss Cuba competed at the pageant. Since 1968, Cuba stopped competing because of the financial crisis and political issues. This pageant was the official event for Cuban women to be ambassadors of Cuba on the international stage. Between 1952–1975, Cuba had already competed at the Miss Universe and Miss World pageants. Cuba has also participated in other pageants such as Miss International, Miss Earth, Miss Supranational, and Miss Grand International. Below are the list of Miss Cuba representatives

Cuba at International pageants

Miss Universe Cuba

Miss World Cuba

Miss International Cuba

Miss Earth Cuba

Miss Supranational Cuba

Miss Grand Cuba

References

External links
Official site

Cuba
Cuba
Recurring events established in 1952
Cuban awards